Lim Kok Wing (19451 June 2021) was a Malaysian businessman, philanthropist, educator, and illustrator. He was the founding president of the Limkokwing University of Creative Technology.

Early life
Lim was born in 1945 in Kuala Lumpur, Malaysia. He attended Methodist Boys School and Cochrane Road Secondary School.

Career

In 1975, at age 29, Lim established advertising firm Wings Creative Consultants. In 1992, he founded the Limkokwing University of Creative Technology in Cyberjaya. He also served as its president. In July 2007, following the establishment of Limkokwing University Botswana, Lim addressed the country's Parliament. The same year, Limkokwing University London was founded. In June 2020, the Limkokwing University of Creative Technology commissioned a billboard depicting Lim as "King of Africa," flanked by a cheetah and surrounded by African students; it was removed after receiving negative online responses.

Death
Lim died on 1 June 2021, aged 75. He had been hospitalised the previous week after falling at home. His death was met with an outpouring of grief by Malaysians; local newspaper The Star described him as "one of the most prominent figures in the higher education sector", while the Unesco Institute for Information Technologies in Education (IITE) called Lim a "great figure in education and philanthropy". Mahathir Mohamad remarked that Lim was an "avid supporter of the Malaysian vision", whereas Najib Razak noted that he "transformed the lives of many".

Recognition
Lim received several awards for both his entrepreneurship and philanthropy. In 2006, he was named CEO of the Year by the Malaysia Canada Business Council. In 2007, he was awarded an honorary professorship by the Moscow Academy of the State and Municipal Management.

References

Citations

Bibliography

External links
 

1945 births
2021 deaths
Heads of universities and colleges in Asia
Malaysian educators
Malaysian illustrators
Malaysian philanthropists
People from Kuala Lumpur